The Destroyer (Part 1) is the third studio album by Canadian electronic music project TR/ST, fronted by Robert Alfons. It is the first half of the two-part album with the same title. It was released on April 19, 2019 by Royal Mountain Records and his own record label Grouch. The album features contributions from Maya Postepski, his collaborator on TR/ST's debut studio album, TRST, as well as Lars Stalfors and Damian Taylor. It is his first release in which he is not credited as Trust.

The second part of the album, The Destroyer (Part 2), was released on November 1, 2019.

Background and release
After the end of the tour supporting his last album, Joyland, Alfons started to work on his third studio album. He commented that "after the first and second record and touring, I was really sort of depleted and I definitely needed to regroup." The artist described the process of creating the album as "healing myself and then experimenting with different ideas about what a song I would put out would be."

In July 2017, Robert Alfons released "Bicep", the first single promoting the album.

On February 5, 2019, Alfons announced the third studio album, alongside its title, release date, artwork and tracklist. On the same day, the artist released the second single, "Gone", promoting the album.

On February 21, 2019, Robert Alfons released the third single off The Destroyer – Part 1, "Unbleached", that was premiered on The Fader, followed by the fourth single, "Grouch", released a month later.

The fifth single, "Colossal", was premiered on BrooklynVegan on April 4, 2019. It is one of the five tracks that Robert Alfons worked on with his collaborator on TR/ST's debut album, Maya Postepski. Alfons commented that the song is "such a special collab" and added that it was written "while in different parts of the world."

Composition
The Destroyer (Part 1) is an industrial, experimental music and cold wave album.

Promotion
To promote the album, Alfons was on a tour in Europe and North America that began on April 9, 2019.

Critical reception

The Destroyer (Part 1) received positive reviews. Heather Phares of AllMusic opined that "it's Alfons' most accomplished work yet" and compared it to project's previous releases as a "more calculated work". She added that the album is "both ambitious and intimate, and the care Alfons took in making and introducing the album to the world via a slow trickle of singles also extends to its craft", while rating it 4 out of 5. Kamryn Feigel of Slug described the album as "unique twist on experimental music" and added that it's "industrial, dark and danceable, all at once."

Lisa Sookraj of Exclaim! rated the album 7 out of 10 while writing in her review that The Destroyer (Part 1) "offers less consistently urgent, fat danceability than previous TR/ST releases, but it is equally passionate and alluring" and called it "mature." In his review for The 405, Francisco Gonçalves Silva declared that Alfons "constructed a narrative that represents him and shines a light into his perseverance and determination to accept his thoughts, come clean and now being ready for a new beginning."

Track listing

Notes
  signifies a co-producer.
  signifies an additional producer.

Personnel
Credits adapted from the liner notes of The Destroyed – Part 1.

Musicians
 Robert Alfons – vocals
 Lia Braswell – live drums 

Technical personnel
 Robert Alfons – production
 Maya Postepski – co-production 
 Lars Stalfors – co-production ; additional production ; mixing 
 Damian Taylor – additional production, mixing 
 Joe LaPorta – mastering

Artwork
 Eliot Lee Hazel – photography
 Ryan Thomas Ormsby – layout, design
 Blake Amstrong – painting

References

2019 albums
Trust (Canadian band) albums
Albums produced by Damian Taylor
Albums produced by Lars Stalfors
Royal Mountain Records albums